Williamson–Sodus Airport  is a privately owned, public use airport in Wayne County, New York, United States. It is located three nautical miles (6 km) west of the central business district of Sodus, and east of Williamson. This airport is included in the National Plan of Integrated Airport Systems for 2011–2015, which categorized it as a reliever airport.

Although most U.S. airports use the same three-letter location identifier for the FAA and IATA, this airport is assigned SDC by the FAA but has no designation from the IATA, which assigned SDC to Sandcreek Airport in Guyana.

Facilities and aircraft 
Williamson–Sodus Airport covers an area of 109 acres (44 ha) at an elevation of 424 feet (129 m) above mean sea level. It has one runway designated 10/28 with an asphalt surface measuring 3,801 by 60 feet (1,159 x 18 m).

For the 12-month period ending September 24, 2010, the airport had 26,536 aircraft operations, an average of 72 per day: 99.9% general aviation and 0.1% military. At that time there were 65 aircraft based at this airport: 89% single-engine, 2% multi-engine, 2% helicopter, and 8% ultralight.

Abraham (Jake) Degroote, proprietor of Williamson Aeronautical, was one of the 6 founding members of the Williamson-Sodus Airport back in 1956.

References

External links 
 Williamson Flying Club
 Williamson Aeronautical
  at New York State DOT Airport Directory
 Aerial photo as of April 1995 from USGS The National Map
 
 

Airports in New York (state)
Transportation in Wayne County, New York
Buildings and structures in Wayne County, New York